Graeme E. McFarland was an American football quarterback for the Indiana Hoosiers football team in 2003, 2005 and 2006. He appeared in 27 games and completed 33 of 72 passes for 355 yards and four touchdowns.

In 2007, McFarland graduated magna cum laude from Indiana University with a bachelor's degree in biology. He later attended medical school at the University of Alabama at Birmingham School of Medicine. He is currently an assistant professor at that school and the associate program director for its general surgery residency.

References

Living people
American football quarterbacks
Indiana Hoosiers football players
Year of birth missing (living people)